Thyretes trichaetiformis is a moth in the  family Erebidae. It was described by Zerny in 1912. It is found in Tanzania.

References

Natural History Museum Lepidoptera generic names catalog

Endemic fauna of Tanzania
Moths described in 1912
Syntomini